is a Japanese figure skater. She is the 2003 World Junior champion and the 2004 Four Continents champion. She announced her retirement from competitive skating in November 2008, due to injury.

Career 
Ota won the bronze medal at the 2000–2001 Japan Junior Championships.  In the 2001–2002 season, Ota made her Junior Grand Prix debut. She won her event in Bulgaria and placed 4th at the event in Sweden to qualify for the Junior Grand Prix Final, where she placed 6th. She won a second bronze medal at the 2001–2002 Japan Junior Championships, which qualified her for the 2002 Junior Worlds. She placed 9th at that competition.  In the 2002–2003 season, Ota competed on the 2002–2003 ISU Junior Grand Prix circuit. She won both her events to qualify for the Junior Grand Prix Final, which she won. She placed fourth at the Japan Championships and qualified for Junior Worlds. She won the 2003 World Junior title. In the 2003–2004 season, Ota made her senior international debut. She competed on the Grand Prix of Figure Skating. She placed 4th at the 2003 Skate Canada International and 6th at the 2003 NHK Trophy. At the Japan Championships, Ota placed fifth. She competed at the 2004 Four Continents and won the event after placing third in the short program and second in the free skate.  In the 2004–2005 season, Ota competed again on the senior international circuit. She placed 7th at the 2004 Skate America.

Ota missed the 2005–2006 season due to injury.  In the 2006–2007 season, Ota began competing again. She placed 12th at the Japan Championships.  In the 2007–2008 season, Ota competed at the 2007 Golden Spin of Zagreb international competition and placed 7th. At the Japan Championship, she placed 7th.  Ota withdrew from events to qualify for the 2008–2009 Japan Championships before they began. 

She announced her retirement from competitive skating on November 26, 2008, her 22nd birthday, due to injury. Following her retirement, she has skated professionally in ice shows.

Programs

Results

References

External links

1986 births
Living people
Japanese female single skaters
Sportspeople from Kyoto
Four Continents Figure Skating Championships medalists
World Junior Figure Skating Championships medalists